Engineering physics (or engineering science)  can be studied at the bachelors, masters and Ph.D. levels at many universities, typically offered in a partnership between engineering faculties and the departments of physics.

Canada 
In Canada, the Canadian Engineering Accreditation Board is responsible for accrediting undergraduate engineering physics programs, graduate study in aerospace engineering is also available at several Canadian post-secondary institutions, though Canadian post-graduate engineering programs do not require accreditation.

 University of Alberta - Engineering Physics
 University of British Columbia - Engineering Physics
 Carleton University - Engineering Physics
 Dalhousie University - Engineering Physics
 McMaster University - Engineering Physics
 Queen's University - Engineering Physics
 Royal Military College of Canada - Engineering Physics
 University of Saskatchewan - Engineering Physics
 Simon Fraser University - Engineering Science
 University of Toronto - Engineering Science

Only undergraduate engineering programs in Canada are accredited, and this is done by the Canadian Engineering Accreditation Board.

References 

Engineering education
Lists of engineering schools